This is a list of people from Salford, a city in North West England. This list includes people from Salford and the wider City of Salford, and thus may include people from Eccles, Swinton, Worsley and other outlying areas of Salford. This list is arranged alphabetically by surname:



A
 Lilias Armstrong (1882–1937), phonetician; born in Pendlebury

B
 David Bamber (born 1954), actor; born in Walkden
 Geoff Bent (1932–1958), English footballer; one of the eight Manchester United players who lost their lives in the Munich air disaster; born at Irlams o' th' Height, Salford
 Nick Blackman (born 1989), English-Israeli footballer
 David Bleakley (1817–1882), cricketer
 Hazel Blears (born 1956), Labour Party politician and former cabinet minister
 George Bradshaw (1800–1853), cartographer and publisher, produced railway guides and timetables known as Bradshaw's Guide
 Francis Brandt (1840–1925), cricketer and Madras High Court judge
 Harold Brighouse (1882–1958), playwright and author best known for Hobson's Choice, set in Salford
 Elkie Brooks (born 1945), singer, born in Salford
 Tim Burgess (born 1967), singer, songwriter

C
 Sydney Chapman (1888–1970), mathematician and geophysicist
 Helen Cherry (1915-2001), English stage, film and television actress, born in Worsley.
 Allan Clarke (born 1942), singer (The Hollies)
 John Cooper Clarke (born 1949), performance poet from Higher Broughton
 Eddie Colman (1936–1958), Manchester United footballer who died in the Munich air disaster in 1958; born on Archie Street in Salford
 Alistair Cooke (1908–2004), U.S. journalist and broadcaster; born in Salford
 William Cooke (1821–1894), clergyman hymn-writer, born in Eccles
 William Crabtree (1610–1644), astronomer, mathematician and merchant; one of only two people to observe and record the first predicted transit of Venus in 1639.
Andy Crane (born 1964), television and radio presenter, lived for a time in Salford

D
 Alfred Darbyshire (1839–1908), architect and painter
 Freddie Davies (born 1937), comedian and actor (Opportunity Knocks)
Sir Peter Maxwell Davies (1934–2016), Salford-born composer and Master of the Queen's Music (2004-2016)
 Brenda De Banzie (1909–1981), actress, moved to Salford as a child
 Shelagh Delaney (1938–2011), playwright, best known for the play A Taste of Honey
 Arthur Thomas Doodson (1890–1968), oceanographer

E
Terry Eagleton, literary theorist born and brought up in Salford
Christopher Eccleston, Salford-born, Little Hulton-brought up stage, film and television actor

F
James Fearnley, musician; native of Worsley
Albert Finney, stage and film actor
Clinton Ford, classic-pop singer
 Stephen Foster, boxer

G
 Ryan Giggs, footballer; moved to Pendlebury as a child
 Joe Gladwin, actor
 Walter Greenwood, novelist, best known for the book and film Love on the Dole
John Gregory, engineer aboard Erebus during Franklin's Lost Expedition

H
 Ren Harvieu, singer-songwriter
 James Hazeldine, actor
 Kallum Higginbotham, professional footballer, currently playing as a striker for Kilmarnock in the Scottish Premiership 

 Isabel Hodgins, actress (Emmerdale)
 Shelley Holroyd, Olympic Javelin Thrower
 Dean Holden, former footballer, currently assistant manager at Oldham Athletic
 Peter Hook, bassist of the bands Joy Division and New Order

J
 Rob James-Collier (1976), actor and model 
 Maggie Jones (1934–2009), actress
 James Prescott Joule, physicist

K
 Joseph Kay (1821–1878), economist and judge
 Damian Keeley (born 1963), former professional footballer
 Yousaf Ali Khan, film director; grew up in Salford
 Ayub Khan-Din, actor and playwright who grew up in Salford
 Ben Kingsley, actor, grew up in Pendlebury
 Pat Kirkwood, musical theatre actress

L
 Mike Leigh, writer and director; grew up in Broughton
 L.S. Lowry, artist; lived in Pendlebury from 1909 to 1948

M
 Ewan MacColl, folk singer, writer
 Jason Manford, comedian and former host of the BBC's The One Show
 William Worrall Mayo, a British-American medical doctor and chemist; founder of the world-renowned Mayo Clinic in Rochester, Minnesota, U.S. Born in Salford in 1819.
 Jamie Moore, former British light-middleweight boxing champion
Sir Norman Moore, doctor and medical historian
 John Moores, businessman 
 Adrian Morley, Great Britain, England, Leeds, Sydney Roosters, Warrington and Salford rugby league player

N
 Graham Nash, singer and musician with the Hollies and Crosby, Stills, Nash & Young; grew up in Salford
 Cornelius Nicholls, cricketer
Mary Naylor, Artist

P
 Emmeline Pankhurst, founder of the British suffragette movement; for a time lived in Salford
 Sacha Parkinson, actress (Coronation Street)
 Charlie Pawsey, rugby league player
 Stan Pearson, former footballer
 Robert Powell, television presenter and film actor (Thirty-nine Steps)
 John Henry Poynting, physicist
 Holly Peers, glamour model

R
 Harold Riley, artist
 Robert Roberts, author
 Alliott Verdon Roe, pioneer pilot and aircraft manufacturer
 Shaun Ryder, vocalist and songwriter with the Happy Mondays

S
 Paul Scholes, England and Manchester United midfielder; born in Salford. 
 Edward Schunck, chemist
 Randolph Schwabe, draughtsman and painter; Slade Professor of Fine Art from 1930–48
 Mark E. Smith, musician (The Fall) 
 Bernard Sumner, singer and musician (Joy Division and New Order)
 Mike Sweeney (DJ), radio broadcaster, musician and DJ

T
 Lewis Tan, actor and martial artist
 John Thomson, actor and comedian

V
 John Virgo, former snooker player; currently commentator

W
 Mike Walker, jazz guitarist
 Tony Warren, television scriptwriter (Coronation Street)
 Russell Watson, tenor
 William Webb Ellis, claimed inventor of rugby football
 Joanne Whalley, actress
 William Joseph Whelan (1924–2021) American biochemist, born in Salford.
 Don Whillans, climber and mountaineer
 Tony Wilson, radio and TV presenter; journalist (Granada Television, BBC)
 Kenneth Wolstenholme, football commentator for BBC television in the 1950s and 1960s, most notable for his commentary during the 1966 FIFA World Cup which included the famous phrase "they think it's all over... it is now"
 Arthur Woolliscroft, footballer, played for Manchester City, Leicester City, Watford and Northwich Victoria
 Thomas Worthington, architect

See also
List of people from Greater Manchester

References

Bibliography

 
Salfordians
Salford